Fatmagül Sakızcan (born March 31, 1992) is a Turkish women's handballer, who plays in the Turkish Women's Handball Super League for Kastamonu Bld. GSK, and the Turkey national team. The -tall sportswoman plays in the left wing position.

Playing career

Club
Sakızcan played for the Istanbul-based team Üsküdar Bld. SK in the Turkish Women's Handball Super League. She took part at the 2012–13 Women's EHF Challenge Cup, at which She enjoyed her team's thrird place. The next season, she played at the EHF Women's Cup Winners' Cup 2013/14 for Üsküdar Beldiyespor.

In July 2014, she joined Ardeşen GSK in Rize, and played one season. She took part at the 2014–15 Women's EHF Challenge Cup. Her team failed to advance to the semifinals after losing to Pogoń Baltica Szczecin from Poland.

For the 2015–2016 season, she transferred to Kastamonu Bld. GSK. She plays at the 2015–16 Women's EHF Challenge Cup for Kastamonu Bld. GSK.

International
In 2009, she was admitted to the Turkey women's national U-17 team. Sakızcan is a member of the Turkey women's national handball team.

Honours
 Turkish Women's Handball Super League
 Runners-up (1): 2011–12, 2012–13.
 Women's EHF Challenge Cup
 Third place (1): 2012–13.

References 

1982 births
Sportspeople from Manisa
Turkish female handball players
Üsküdar Belediyespor players
Ardeşen GSK players
Kastamonu Bld. SK (women's handball) players
Turkey women's national handball players
Living people
21st-century Turkish women